Ricky Bevis (born 26 February 2000), better known by his ring name Ricky Knight Jr., is an English professional wrestler. He is best known for his work with Revolution Pro Wrestling (RPW), where he was the former Undisputed British Heavyweight Champion.

A third-generation wrestler, he is the son of Roy Knight and the grandson of Ricky Knight. Other family members include his uncle Zak Zodiac and his aunt Saraya. He has also wrestled for the family promotion World Association of Wrestling, where he is a multi-time champion.

Championships and accomplishments 
British Wrestling Revolution
BWR Heavyweight Championship (1 time, current)
BWR Cruiserweight Championship (1 time)
European Catch Tour Association
ECTA Junior Heavyweight Championship (1 time, final)
ECTA Tag Team Championship (1 time) – with PJ Knight
Immortal Wrestling
IW King Of England Championship (1 time)
Revolution Pro Wrestling
Undisputed British Heavyweight Championship (1 time)
Southside Heavyweight Championship (1 time)
Undisputed British Tag Team Championship (1 time) – with Roy Knight
Southside Heavyweight Championship Tournament (2020)
Southside Wrestling Entertainment
SWE European Championship (1 time)
SWE Speed King Championship (2 times)
SWE Tag Team Championship (1 time) – with Roy Knight and Zak Knight
Target Wrestling
High Octane Division Championship (1 time)
World Association of Wrestling
WAW Undisputed World Heavyweight Championship (1 time)
WAW British Heavyweight Championship (2 times)
WAW European Heavyweight Championship (1 time)
WAW Open Light Heavyweight Championship (1 time)
WAW Television Championship (2 times, current)
WAW U23 Championship (1 time)
WAW World Tag Team Championship (5 times) – with Hot Stuff, Ivan Trevors, Jimmy Ocean, Ricky Knight, Steve Quintain and Alex Young (1), Alexander Young (2), Roy Knight (1) and Brett Semtex (1, current)

References

External links 
 Ricky Knight Jr. Profile at World Association of Wrestling
 
 

2000 births
Living people
21st-century professional wrestlers
English male professional wrestlers
Sportspeople from Norwich
Undisputed British Heavyweight Champions
Undisputed British Tag Team Champions
Progress Wrestling Atlas Champions